Lloyd Henry Gaston (2 December 1929 – 24 September 2006) was a Canadian theologian, protestant biblical scholar, associate professor, and professor emeritus of New Testament at Vancouver School of Theology, Vancouver, British Columbia, Canada. He also was a president of the Canadian Society of Biblical Studies and Pastor of United Presbyterian Church in the United States of America.

Biography 
Gaston was born in Mongatown, West Virginia. He was ordained in the United Presbyterian Church in the United States of America, in 1961, and served as Pastor of First Presbyterian Church, Hamburg, New Jersey, till 1963.

Marriage and children 
His wife's name is Suzanne, his sons Johannes, Thomas Christopher.

Death 
Lloyd H. Gaston, Jr. died on September 24, 2006.

Education 
Gaston graduated from the Horace Mann School at New York City. In 1952 Gaston studied at Dartmouth College and earned his B.A. suma cum laude with distinction in Philosophy, and he was a member of Delta Upsilon Fraternity. He graduated Phi Beta Kappa in 1952 after taking a year off to study in France and Switzerland. He served two years in the U.S. Army and then pursued graduate studies at the University of Basel, Switzerland. With his dissertation No stone on another: studies in the significance of the fall of Jerusalem in the synoptic gospels, in 1967 Gaston earned his ThD summa cum laude at the University of Basel, Switzerland, in New Testament. He also studied at Ulpan Ezion, Jerusalem, in 1970.

Academic work

Teaching 
Gaston had a 40-year academic career. From 1963 to 1973 he taught at the Department of Religion, Macalester College in St. Paul, Minnesota, and during this time he earned his ThD at the University of Basel. From 1973 he was visiting professor of New Testament at United Theological Seminary of the Twin Cities. After Gaston taught in these colleges, in 1973 Gaston was called, and from 1973 to 1978 Gaston was Associate Professor of New Testament at Vancouver School of Theology. From 1978, Gaston was Professor of New Testament at Vancouver School of Theology until his retirement in 1995, where he became emeritus professor. As professor emeritus, he continued teaching.

Canadian Society of Biblical Studies 
From 1986 to 87 Gaston was president of the Canadian Society of Biblical Studies CSBS (or Société Canadienne des Études Bibliques SCÉB).

Works

Thesis

Books

References

External links 

1929 births
2006 deaths
New Testament scholars
Academic staff of the Vancouver School of Theology
University of Basel alumni